The Royal Aviation Museum of Western Canada (formerly the Western Canada Aviation Museum) is a museum in Winnipeg, Manitoba, Canada. The museum opened to the public in its new location on 21 May 2022.

History
The Western Canada Aviation Museum was incorporated in 1974. In November of that year, it put forward an application to the federal government for a grant to set up a  site at St. Andrews Airport. However, the museum ended up in downtown Winnipeg near the Manitoba Museum of Man and Nature. By the next year, the museum had 25 military and civilian aircraft in its collection. In the mid-1980s, the museum moved to a former Trans Canada Air Lines and Transair hangar, T-2, at Winnipeg International Airport.

The museum developed a master plan for a new facility in 2013 with the design firm Reich&Petch.

The museum received the Royal designation on December 19, 2014, to become the Royal Aviation Museum of Western Canada.

The museum closed its Ferry Road site in October 2018 after the lease on the hangar expired. However, following a grant from the federal government in July 2019, construction of a new  museum building began in May 2020. By November that year, construction was more than half complete, and construction of the facility was completed on August 4, 2021.

Exhibits
The museum has a large hangar floor, and a mezzanine with a view of the adjacent Winnipeg James Armstrong Richardson International Airport runways. Aircraft are displayed on the floor and suspended from the ceiling, and include one-of-a-kind aircraft, military jets, bush planes, and commercial aircraft. Exhibits are clustered in zones representing different aspects of aviation history, such as Canadian Innovation, Northern Connections, and Military Skies. Interactive displays such as Experience Flight and the Mechanics Workshop present a hands-on educational experience.

Collection
The museum's collection includes over 90 historic aircraft, 70,000 artefacts, texts, and photographs.

 Auster AOP.6
 Avro CF-100 Canuck 5 18674
 Avrocar – replica
 Beechcraft CT-134 Musketeer 134235
 Beechcraft Expeditor 3N 1477
 Bellanca 14-13 1208
 Bellanca Aircruiser Eldorado Radium Silver Express – under restoration
 Bristol Freighter 31 9699
 Canadair CL-84 CX8403
 Canadair Sabre 6 1815
 Canadair Silver Star 21075
 Canadair CT-114 Tutor 114004
 Canadian Vickers Vedette Composite
 CASA 352L T.2B-148 – converted to resemble Ju 52/1m
 de Havilland Fox Moth Composite
 de Havilland Tiger Moth
 de Havilland Canada DHC-2 Beaver 1500
 Fairchild 71C 516
 Fairchild F-11 Husky 2
 Fairchild Super 71 50
 Fokker Universal
 Fokker Super Universal Composite 
 Froebe helicopter
 Froebe ornithopter
 Heath Parasol
 Kolb Flyer
 Lockheed Model 10A Electra 1528
 McDonnell CF-101 Voodoo 101034
 Noorduyn Norseman IVW 2456
 North American Harvard
 North American NA-64 Yale 3430
 Schweizer SGU 2-22 glider C-FACL
 Stinson SR-8CM Reliant 9733
 Vickers Viscount 279
 Waco YKC-S 4267 – under restoration

Archives and library
The comprehensive aviation reference library housed at the museum is one of the largest in the country, with holdings of books, magazines, technical manuals, and drawings, as well as some 40,000 photographs, films, and audiotapes, many of which cannot be found anywhere else.

One item in the archives is a rare, five-minute film of Amelia Earhart embarking on her solo trans-Atlantic flight from Harbour Grace, Newfoundland, on May 21, 1932.

The library is open to the public on an appointment basis and photos, films, and audiotapes are loaned or copied on request.

Recovery and restoration
The museum has an active Restoration Department and has returned many damaged aircraft to full display condition. A team of volunteers completed a full-scale replica of a Canadian Vickers Vedette Mark V (CF-MAG) aircraft in May 2002.

The museum has facilitated the recovery of several aircraft, including the "Ghost of Charron Lake" - a Fokker Standard Universal that has taken more than 30 years to locate. It will be displayed as it appeared at the bottom of the lake.

Affiliations
The museum is affiliated with the Canadian Museums Association,  Canadian Heritage Information Network, and the Virtual Museum of Canada.

See also
Minnesota Aviation Hall of Fame
List of aerospace museums
List of Canadian organizations with royal prefix

References

Notes

Bibliography

 Hunt, Leslie. Veteran and Vintage Aircraft. New York: Taplinger Publishing Co., Inc., 1971. .
 Ogden,Bob. Great Aircraft Collections of the World. New York: Gallery Books,  1986. .

External links 

Aviation history of Canada
Aerospace museums in Manitoba
Museums in Winnipeg
Tourist attractions in Winnipeg
Western Canada